Wandering Miko  are a form of Miko that once existed in much of Japan.

Overview 
They did not belong to a specific Shinto shrine, but made a living by traveling around the country praying, ordaining, and advocating. There were also walking maidens who doubled as Itinerant poets and prostitutes. For this reason, they are also called Shirayu-moji, another name for a prostitute, and Tabi-jo-rou. They are known as Azusa Miko, who performed oracles by sounding strings, and Kumano Higauni, who spread the Kumano faith throughout Japan.

Waka (a priestess who served a shrine called Wakamiya), Agata Shirayamamiko Moriko (the wife of a Yamabushi), and others, all of whom are said to have carried their gods with them and traveled from place to place to perform Kamado harahi and Mediumship.

Shinano Miko 
A walking shrine maiden who left present-day Nagano Prefecture Tōmi City and walked throughout Japan. It is said that during the Sengoku period, Mochizuki Chiyome trained these maidens for the Kai Takeda clan and used them to gather information. This is sometimes referred to as the Kunoichi.

Origins 
According to Kunio Yanagita, she was originally a priestess of the Suwa Shrine called Nonou (from the call or scripture), and traveled around the country as a preacher of the Suwa faith.

Beginning of prostitution 
As her passion for the gods faded, she established a community of shrine maidens around the village of Nezu, and according to Yanagida, she later wandered around again as a shrine maiden performing Mediumship In many places, she is called Manchi or Mannichi (from Mannihyo), Nonou, Tabi-niro (Niigata), Iinawa or Iitsuna (under Kyoto Prefecture), Kongarasama (Okayama Prefecture, because her dance resembles Whirligig beetle), Oshihe, Tohjibanashi (Shimane Prefecture), Naoshi (Hiroshima Prefecture), and Naoshi (Hiroshima Prefecture). They were beautiful women between the ages of seventeen and eight, and in their thirties. They appeared in various places from the Kanto to the Kinki region, and went around asking people to talk to them. They were said to have appeared in various places from the Kanto region to the Kinki region, and to have gone around saying, "Would you like to speak to the shrine maidens?" They were dressed in a small box called a gaiho-bako, wrapped in a navy blue furoshiki (wrapping cloth) sewn into a boat shape, and carried on their backs.

The ritual is to pour water with withered leaves into a box called a gaihou box, and then lie face down. I went. The gods inside are not certain, but according to Ichiro Hori, there was "a five-inch statue of Kukunouchi (a scarecrow with a bow), a wooden statue of Kiboko (a man and a woman combined), a one-inch Buddha, a dried cat head, a white dog skull, dolls, and straw dolls. There are records.

From New Year's Day of the lunar calendar to April, he would leave Nonou Koji in the old Nishi-machi of Nemitsu Village, travel to various places to work, and return by New Year's Eve at the latest. When he returned, he would perform a cold purification ceremony.

During the pilgrimage, the head of each shrine maiden village, called "Kahenushi" or "Boppoku", would scout out beautiful girls between the ages of 8 or 9 and 15 or 6 from various places (from Kanto to Kishu, mainly from Mino and Hida), either as a fixed age or as an adopted daughter. They were scouted and brought back to Shinshu to be trained by a senior nonou for three to five years before becoming a full-fledged master. According to Kenichi Tanigawa and Taro Nakayama, they were welcomed by the locals when they visited various places with a few things, and according to Nakayama, there is even a legend that "a Shinano priest is as rich as a spear (1,000 stones), and his luggage is carried by a specialist, so he can walk around without bills. Of course, this was only because he was in the secular world, so he often "spread the money around" generously.

They came to Kansai (near Kawachinagano City) until around the early Meiji era.

References

Bibliography 

 Taro Nakayama, "History of Japanese Shrine Maidens
 Kunio Yanagita, "Miko Ko", in "Teibon Kunio Yanagita Shu Vol. 9".
 Ichiro Hori, A Study of the History of Beliefs among My People.
 Ken'ichi Tanigawa, "Ijin no Ijin to Geijutsu (Different Gods and Performing Arts of the Lowly)," Iwanami Shoten
 Ishikawa, Yoshikazu, "Shinano no Arukushimiko: The Real Image of Nonou, a Walking Miko in the Village of Nezu," Green Art Publishing Co.

History of Shinto
Performing arts in Japan
Miko
Walking